Starscream is a fictional character in the Transformers media franchise. He is one of the most frequently occurring characters in the franchise, appearing in almost all of its different continuities. Starscream is generally depicted as the second-in-command of the Decepticon leader Megatron who transforms into a jet fighter and leads the Seekers, a group of Decepticons who share his body type. Across most continuities, Starscream's defining trait is his desire to overthrow Megatron and assume command of the Decepticons. This is usually out of greed and selfishness, though in some continuities, Starscream has been shown to genuinely care about the Decepticon cause and wish to bring it back on the right path, perceiving Megatron as a corrupt leader who led the Decepticons astray. Alternatively, other incarnations of Starscream have been portrayed as unquestionably loyal to Megatron or as an antihero who has tried (and sometimes even succeeded) to make peace with the Decepticons' arch-enemies, the Autobots.

Character biography 
Authors have created many characters in the franchise based on the appeal of Starscream's treachery and cunning; most of these share his desire to lead the Decepticons. Starscream has the ambition to overthrow Megatron as the Decepticons' leader. He has controlled the Decepticons at times, but he usually suffers defeat. Starscream is ruthless, cruel, bloodthirsty, and more intelligent than the average Decepticon, but also, unlikely to act directly on these aspirations without first securing conditions favorable to his ascension. He considers himself vastly superior to other Decepticons and finds Megatron contemptible for his antiquated military strategies and tactics.

Starscream believes the Decepticons should employ guile and speed more readily than brute force to defeat the Autobots. However, given the chance to lead, he is often less successful in this than Megatron. While Megatron frequently overlooks him as a threat, authors suggest such reasons for Megatron's tolerance of Starscream's presence as a grudging respect for his scheming nature and precautionary observation. Others suggest that Starscream's treacherous nature is welcomed; that without a threat to his command, Megatron believes he would become soft and overconfident, or that he even found his transgressions amusing. Even so, Starscream often quickly exhausts Megatron's patience; violent-yet-brief verbal and/or physical conflicts between the two are not uncommon. As such, there have been times when Megatron has been close to killing Starscream.

In his original appearance, Starscream transforms into a McDonnell Douglas F-15 Eagle. As Decepticon Air Commander, he leads the other Decepticon Seeker jets, many of whom share his physical design. Launchers mounted on his arm (under his wings in jet mode) can deliver cluster bombs capable of leveling a  area and fire his signature null ray, which for brief periods disrupts the flow of electricity in any circuitry it contacts. This action temporarily renders inoperable any electronic device or machine, including Transformers.

Animated series

Generation 1 
Starscream was formerly a scientist and explorer, working with the future Autobot Skyfire, during the Golden Age of Cybertron, shortly before the Autobot/Decepticon war re-erupted. Following the disappearance of Skyfire when the two were exploring a prehistoric Earth, Starscream returned to Cybertron and soon abandoned his scientific pursuits, becoming a warrior in Megatron's Decepticon army as the civil war exploded. Starscream attended the Cybertron War Academy, mentioned in the episode "A Prime Problem".
Starscream makes use of his old scientific profession in a few episodes. For example, in "A Decepticon Raider in King Arthur's Court", when he and several other Decepticons were temporarily displaced in time to medieval England, the weapons of the Transformers ceased functioning; Starscream knew how to use available materials to create gunpowder as a substitute for himself and the other Decepticons.

In "Starscream's Brigade", he attempts—in what was then only his latest in a series of attempts—to overthrow Megatron as the leader of the Decepticons. After being defeated and exiled in Guadalcanal, Starscream finds the remains of some World War II military vehicles, which inspire him to create an army of his own. He travels to Cybertron using the Space Bridge, forcing the guards and eluding Shockwave to do so. He breaks into the Decepticon Detention Center and steals the five personality components of Renegade Decepticons, then installs them into five wrecked military vehicles and they become the Combaticons. The Combaticons (who combine to form Bruticus) and Starscream then capture four Transformers. When Megatron rallies his troops (except the Stunticons) against Starscream and the Combaticons, he deploys Devastator to fight Bruticus, but Devastator is defeated. Megatron attempts to retreat, however Starscream orders Bruticus to capture Megatron and hold him while he gloats and humiliates him. While this is going on, the Stunticons arrive, combine into Menasor and defeat Bruticus. Megatron then orders Astrotrain to exile Starscream and the Combaticons to a distant asteroid. In the next episode, "The Revenge of Bruticus", the Combaticons blame Starscream for their punishment. They imprison him on Cybertron after he abandons them, and plan a devastating revenge on Megatron by pulling the Earth towards the Sun using Cybertron's controls. After proving his worth in helping Megatron and Optimus Prime (who teamed up to prevent the Earth from destruction) stop the deranged Bruticus, Starscream gets restored to Decepticon ranks.

In The Transformers: The Movie, Starscream and many other Decepticons participate in the battle of Autobot City, leaving several Autobots killed. After the Decepticons' defeat, they retreat to Astrotrain. In order to reduce Astrotrain's mass, the Decepticons were left with no choice but to jettison the heavily damaged Skywarp, Thundercracker, and Insecticons into space, and Starscream tosses a mortally wounded Megatron out of Astrotrain. After that, he nominates himself as the new leader of the Decepticons. However, during a grandiose coronation ceremony, Megatron, who has been reborn as Galvatron alongside Cyclonus, Scourge and the Sweeps, arrives and declares the coronation a "bad comedy". Starscream realizes that Galvatron was once Megatron, and Galvatron transforms into laser cannon mode, obliterating Starscream with a single shot.

However, while Starscream's body has disintegrated, his "spark" remains as a ghost and returns later. In "Starscream's Ghost", he encounters his old friend Octane in the Decepticon Crypt and conspires with him to hand Galvatron over to Rodimus Prime, the new leader of the Autobots. Starscream possesses Cyclonus's body and tricks Galvatron into being captured by the Autobots. Galvatron escapes and later shoots Cyclonus when he realizes that Starscream's ghost is possessing his second-in-command. The vengeful ghost easily escapes and re-appears in an additional episode, "Ghost in the Machine". In the episode, he first appears to possess Scourge and reactivates the head of Unicron. Starscream then makes a deal with Unicron to restore the latter's sight and body by stealing the eyes of Metroplex and transformation cog of Trypticon, and wiring Unicron's head to Cybertron. Starscream successfully accomplishes most of this, however, when he can no longer possess Scourge, he demands that Unicron restore his own, original body so that he can complete the connections. Unicron complies and again demands that Starscream complete the connections, only to have Starscream double-cross him and tell him to "do it himself". At this point, the Autobots set off an explosion that blows Unicron's head and Starscream out into space. As Starscream tumbles out of control, he encounters the Decepticons who unleash all of their firepowers on him, damaging him and pushing him farther into space. Starscream is not encountered again in G1.

Beast Wars 
The G1 incarnation of Starscream returns in Beast Wars: Transformers, voiced by Doug Parker. In the episode "Possession", He takes control of Waspinator's body while a lightning storm occurs. The Predacons recognize him as Air Commander Starscream of the Decepticons. Starscream claims that he had been killed in battle defending Galvatron from Unicron, and pledges his allegiance to the Predacon leader Megatron. In reality, he was destroyed by Galvatron, and plots to usurp Megatron and take control of the Predacons. He captures the Maximal base, and later holds Optimus Primal and Dinobot hostage, ordering the Maximals to attack the Predacon base in exchange for their safety. He is defeated by the combined efforts of Optimus Primal and Blackarachnia, freeing Waspinator's body, and sending Starcream's ghost hurtling back into the depths of space. In "The Agenda", Starscream makes a cameo appearance aboard the Ark, frozen in a stasis lock.

Beast Wars II 
In the Japanese-exclusive animated series, Beast Wars II, a character named Starscream was one of Galvatron's most loyal minions. Like the Decepticon air commander who came before him, Starscream is both ambitious and deadly. He makes up for his lack of size with unmatched speed and maneuverability. He hopes to one day dethrone Galvatron as the Predacon emperor of destruction and rule the universe himself. He is also slightly effeminate, often laughing and gesturing in a shaky way. When transformed Starscream becomes a stealth fighter capable of soaring at very high speed. In fighter mode, he can use the "Formation Scream" and combine it with his loyal partner BB to become a powerful air fighter, in which Starscream forms the rear of the combination. In robot mode, his attack of choice is his "Screamwinder Missiles" which are strong enough to vaporize most opponents. Starscream tries to undermine his equally treacherous rival Megastorm. Starscream, during an assassination attempt, accidentally turned Megastorm into Gigastorm. Gigastorm paid Starscream and BB back in kind, but exposure to Angalmosis energy turned them into Hellscream and Max B. As Hellscream, he has the beast mode of a cyborg shark, whilst Max B transforms into a cyborg wolf. Hellscream is last seen escaping the exploding Nemesis with Max B and Gigastorm. They do not reappear in Beast Wars Neo, leaving Hellscream, Max B, and Gigastorm's fates and activities unknown.

Unicron Trilogy 

Starscream appears in Transformers: Armada as a young arrogant warrior who desperately wished to gain the approval and respect of his leader Megatron (in contrast to his G1 counterpart), but started to become confused as he began to hate both himself and his commander for the abuse heaped upon him as well as being disgusted with his leader's lack of honor and respect over his troops. He originally came to Earth as part of Megatron's expedition to gain the power of the Mini-Cons alongside Demolishor and Cyclonus. However, Starscream's frustration over having been made the last of the Decepticons to gain his partner Mini-Con led him to be manipulated by Sideways into battling with Megatron, which he lost.  His hatred for Megatron eventually led to him siding with the Autobots so he could bring his former leader down once and for all. During his time with the Autobots, he formed a surprisingly close friendship with the human Alexis. However, Thrust eventually manipulated Starscream into rejoining the Decepticons, though Starscream still vowed to destroy Megatron.

During the Unicron Battles, Starscream was one of the five Cybertronians who received a power boost from the Mini-Cons, giving him a new blue color scheme that makes him look like Thundercracker. Despite having the original G1 Thundercracker color scheme, Starscream was never renamed into the fellow seeker but had stated "I look like Thundercracker" when he gained the new body colors. When Thrust was ousted as a servant of Unicron, Starscream reunited with Alexis and gave chase, though he ultimately failed to catch him. When Megatron, now calling himself "Galvatron", refused to acknowledge the existence of Unicron and the potential threat he carried, Starscream challenged his leader to a duel and allowed him to stab him in the chest with the Star Saber. After a final sendoff with Galvatron, the seeker pulled the Star Saber out of his chest, exposing his spark, and fired on Unicron directly, only for the Chaos Bringer to fire a bolt of lightning that completely disintegrated Starscream, killing him. Starscream's death ultimately convinced Galvatron of Unicron's existence and he allied the Decepticons with the Autobots to end the threat.

In Energon, set ten years later, Alpha Q revives Starscream and wipes all memories of his old life to use him as his personal assassin. However, Megatron eventually gets a hold of Starscream, using his newfound connection with Unicron to brainwash him into his loyal second-in-command. Later in the series, he is exposed to a pool of super energon, making his armor impervious to laser fire as well as recoloring it, making him resemble his original G1 colors. In the final episode, Starscream, along with Mirage, follows Galvatron into an energon sun, Galvatron having done so to break Unicron's hold over him.

Starscream returned again in Cybertron as a darker, more ruthless character. While he appears to be loyal to Megatron like he was in Energon, he secretly prepares a coup against him to become the leader of the Decepticons. This results in a fracturing of the group, with Starscream discovering a group of ancient Decepticons, including two named Thunderblast and Lugnutz; he also recruits neutral Transformers Sideways and Soundwave. After several encounters, Starscream and Galvatron have one final battle which ends with Starscream, Soundwave, and Sideways being transported into another dimension. He is later located by Wing Saber, who teams up with Landmine and Mudflap to go after him.

Transformers: Animated 
Starscream appears in the 2007 animated series, voiced by Tom Kenny. He transforms into a futuristic harrier jet (sporting a notable similarity to the Variable Fighters of Macross fame in his transformation sequence) and resembles his Generation 1 counterpart in both design, personality, and ambitions. He flies at high speeds in both modes, and wields his trademark null-rays, though these function simply as powerful lasers. He's unintentionally comical in this incarnation displaying occasional incompetence. However, this incarnation displays a resolute tenacity towards his objective, shown by his flying around in a brutally damaged Nemesis to track down the Allspark's energy signature for 50 years by himself. Although slightly cowardly, Starscream is an excellent warrior, since he almost single-handedly took down all of the Autobots in a battle over the Allspark. He is also more narcissistic than most incarnations of the character, frequently congratulating and praising himself, his plans, and his looks, with absolute glee. 

In Season 1, Starscream betrays and tries to kill Megatron in the first episode. Megatron learns about this soon after and kills Starscream in the season finale. In Season 2, a battle between Autobots and Decepticons destroys the Allspark, but Starscream is resurrected by a shard of the Allspark that had been embedded on his forehead. Throughout the season, Starscream continues to try and eliminate Megatron, but his plans fail every time. One attempt includes Starscream's creation of a squadron of clones of himself, each one of which embodies a side of his personality. Unfortunately for Starscream, these clones (except Thundercracker and Skywarp, who are sucked into space) eventually betray him and join Megatron. In the season finale, Starscream's body is destroyed, reducing him to nothing more than his head. In Season 3, Starscream "teams up" with Megatron to conquer Cybertron and destroy the Autobots, only to betray him again after regaining his body in the season finale. However, he is stopped by Lugnut and dies after the Allspark fragment keeping him alive is removed from his forehead.

Aligned series 

Starscream is part of the main group of Decepticons in the 2010 computer animated series Transformers: Prime. This version is depicted as a much darker character, constantly plotting his rise to becoming the Decepticon leader and mercilessly killing Autobots, as evidenced when he terminates Cliffjumper in the series premiere. He displays contempt for Decepticons who do not choose a flying alternate mode, such as Knock Out. Although he may look weak, he possesses lethal weapons such as his missiles and sharp claws and has been shown to be a master manipulator. 

Throughout the first half of season one, Starscream serves as the Decepticons' leader after Megatron is critically injured and placed on life support (aided in his injuries by Starscream's attempt to assassinate him). However, once Megatron revives, Starscream is beaten and punished, returning to his position as second-in-command. Following Megatron's attempt to destroy Starscream, as well as his further humiliation at the hands of the Decepticon Airachnid, Starscream attempts to defect to the Autobots, only to be almost killed by Arcee after she discovers he is the one who murdered Cliffjumper, her former partner. He subsequently decides to go independent, seeking revenge against both the Autobots and Megatron.

In season two, Starscream makes several attempts to get back at the Autobots and Megatron, such as siding with the human terrorist organization M.E.C.H. and creating several clones of himself, but these all end in failure (and even result in him losing his ability to transform for most of the season), and he becomes more comedic in his ineptitude. He eventually gains a powerful Iacon relic known as the Apex Armor, and also manages to obtain speed-enhancing red energon, though he loses the former to the Autobot Smokescreen. After learning of the Omega Keys, powerful Cybertronian relics that can be used to revive Cybertron, Starscream decides to steal them from the Autobots and give them to Megatron as a peace offering, wishing to rejoin the Decepticons. He succeeds, and soon regains his old position as Megatron's first lieutenant after his current second-in-command, Dreadwing, is killed. Starscream is later instrumental in the kidnapping of the Autobots' human allies, the creation of the Decepticon fortress Darkmount on Earth, and the destruction of the Autobot base.

In season three, Starscream is forced to share his high-ranking position with Shockwave, and tries to earn Megatron's respect by finding the Autobots before his rival, which results in an outbreak of energon vampires when he foolishly combines Dark Energon with unstable Synthetic Energon, resulting in the loss of over half of the Decepticon forces and the Insecticons Hive. Starscream is also distrustful of Predaking, the Predacon cloned by Shockwave to hunt down the Autobots, a feeling which is proven correct when Predaking shows he is sentient and capable of transforming. It is also he who suggests terminating the Predacon soldiers they have been creating, including Predaking, and blames it on the Autobots, later causing Predaking to turn against them after he learns the truth. In the season finale, "Deadlock", Starscream helps the other Decepticons fight the Autobots when they board the Nemesis, and later witnesses Bumblebee slay Megatron with the Star Saber, before escaping with Shockwave to go into hiding. 

In the TV movie Predacons Rising, which functions as the finale to Transformers: Prime, Starscream and Shockwave are the only remaining Decepticons on Cybertron, as the others have either been taken prisoners or joined the Autobots, forcing the pair to constantly move labs to avoid detection. Starscream helps Shockwave clone two Predacons, Skylynx and Darksteel, as part of their plan to rebuild the Decepticon army, and is later witness with Shockwave to the arrival of Unicron (possessing Megatron's upgraded and resurrected body), who plans to destroy his brother Primus, who forms Cybertron's core. Believing Unicron cannot be stopped, Starscream frees the captive Decepticons, including Knock Out, and attempts to take command of the Nemesis and flee Cybertron, but is stopped after Knock Out betrays him and sides with the Autobots. Starscream is then imprisoned along with the other Decepticons, though he eventually escapes and returns to Megatron after the latter is freed from Unicron's control. Starscream is eager to rejoin him, but Megatron rebuffs, saying that he has lost his taste for inflicting oppression and that the Decepticons are no more. Starscream then eagerly attempts to reinstate himself as leader of the Decepticons but is confronted by Predaking, Skylynx, and Darksteel, who are intent on revenge for their cruel treatment at his hands. Starscream is last seen fleeing terrified by Skylynx and Darksteel.

In the sequels series Transformers: Robots in Disguise, it is revealed that Starscream survived his encounter with the Predacons, having inadvertently killed Skylynx and Darksteel by setting off a room full of weapons. After reformatting his body, he hid until he could regain his full power, tracking seven Minicons Megatron had been experimenting on to give himself greater power than even a Prime. This led the Autobots to believe he was dead and allowed him to operate incognito. Eventually, Starscream was able to find the Minicons on Earth, and hired an Insecticon and two mercenaries named Roughedge and Shadelock to retrieve them for him. He also came into possession of Megatron's Dark Star Saber and promptly took control of it, though the sword rejected him and he could not access its full power. Nevertheless, he still desired the Minicons' power as part of his plans for revenge and galactic conquest.

After the Autobots Fixit, Jetstorm and Slipstream are captured during the hunt for the Minicons, Starscream has them brought to him. Upon learning that his old enemy, Bumblebee, is also on Earth, he threatens to terminate the Minicons unless Bumblebee surrenders to him. Bumblebee promptly does so in order to secure their release, and Starscream merges with six of the seven Minicons. Unfortunately for Starscream, Optimus Prime arrives and merges with the seventh Minicon before defeating Starscream with the help of Bumblebee's team. After being separated from the Minicons, Starscream falls comatose and is loaded onto Optimus's ship for transport back to Cybertron where he will face justice for his crimes.

Books 
Starscream appears in the following books:
 The 1984 sticker and story book Return to Cybertron written by Suzanne Weyn and published by Marvel Books.
 The 1984 sticker and story book The Revenge of the Decepticons written by Suzanne Weyn and published by Marvel Books.
 The 1985 Find Your Fate Junior book called Battle Drive by Barbara Siegel and Scott Siegel.
 The 1985 Transformers audio books Autobots' Lightning Strike, Megatron's Fight For Power, Autobots Fight Back and Laserbeak's Fury, as well as Galvatron's Air Attack from the 1986 series.
 The 1985 audio book Sun Raid. 
 The 1986 story and coloring book The Lost Treasure of Cybertron by Marvel Books. 
 Starscream was featured in the 1993 Transformers: Generation 2 coloring book "Decepticon Madness" by Bud Simpson.

Starscream appears in the novel Transformers: Exodus, and its sequels; Transformers: Exiles and Transformers: Retribution. Here he and the Seekers were the bodyguards of Sentinel Prime, but captured him and pledged their allegiance to Megatron when the war between Autobots and Decepticons broke out. Starscream proved to be a treacherous subordinate as usual, looking for every opportunity to play both sides to his advantage so that his circumstances would be favorable regardless of the outcome. In an attempt to see Megatron destroyed, he released Sentinel Prime so that the deposed leader could eliminate the leader of the Decepticons, only to see Sentinel Prime fall. Starscream attacked Megatron himself, but proved unable to defeat the Decepticon leader and was forced to submit to his authority again. He would join the crew of the Nemesis, and continue to seek Megatron's overthrow through a bargain with the Quintessons.

Comics

Marvel Comics 
Serving as one of Megatron's elite troops in the attack on the Ark, the Marvel Comics incarnation of Starscream possessed the desire to take leadership of the Decepticons, but in the early days of the war on Earth, he did not accomplish any notable acts apart from nearly getting scrapped by Megatron after one snide comment. When he participated in an attack on the Ark with several of his fellow Decepticons, Starscream was deactivated by Omega Supreme, and sealed in a stasis pod in the Ark for a prolonged period of time. 

At the same time, the U. K. offices of Marvel Comics were producing their own storylines which were interspersed throughout the U.S. material. Simon Furman portrayed the character's scheming and ambition with more subtlety than the animated series, making Starscream more intelligent and cunning. He was often the focus of his own stories, including a Christmas special based around Starscream's misery at being stranded on Earth. In this story and in many others written by Furman, Starscream often came across as wry and sarcastic. He was one of the most formidable warriors in the Decepticon army and adversaries were often shown to be visibly intimidated by him. 

Starscream made an appearance in the Decepticon forces under the command of Megatron in issue #7 of the Marvel Generation 2 comic series; in a story called "New Dawn" Megatron led his Decepticons against Jhiaxus' second generation Cybertronians near the moon of Tykos. The Decepticons were defeated and Megatron was left injured, presumed dead, but swearing revenge.

Fun Publications 
Based on the Transformers Classics toy line, the Timelines 2007 story is set 15 years after the end of the Marvel Comics story (ignoring all events of the Marvel U.K. and Generation 2 comics). Megatron survived the crash of the Ark on Earth. He is joined by Starscream, who realized he needed a leader. In Transformers: Timelines volume 2 #2, "Games of Deception" Megatron detects the arrival of Bugbite's ship on Earth and sends Starscream, Skywarp and Ramjet to investigate. The three Seekers are then taken over by Bugbite's cerebro shells (with Starscream swearing to painfully dismember Bugbite for it). When the Autobots eventually jam the shells to facilitate their own rescue of Mirage, Starscream is freed and battles Bugbite's faction. Whether he survived the battle is unknown. He seems to retain his usual second-in-command status in this story.  Starscream reported to Deathsaurus on the success of the Combaticons' attack on the Autobot Elite Guard.

Shattered Glass 

This Starscream is a morally good version of the Generation 1 character from the BotCon exclusive "Shattered Glass" comic, in which the Decepticons are on the side of good and the Autobots on the side of evil. This version is loyal to Megatron, as opposed to his normally treacherous portrayal. He longs to return to his life as a scientist. Also, Megatron treats Starscream with far more respect and considers him a genius. 

Starscream appears in the 2008 April Fool's comic Shattered Expectations by Fun Publications. He and Razorclaw confront his world's Goldbug, Grimlock and Jazz. When the Autobots refuse to surrender the Decepticons call in the Mayhem Suppression Squad.

Starscream then appears in the BotCon 2008 Timelines comic Transformers: Timelines story "Shattered Glass" as one of the troops of the heroic Decepticon Megatron. Starscream, Divebomb and Whisper drop "glass gas" bombs on the Autobot's Ark launch platform to make it vulnerable to attack.

Starscream appears in the fiction Dungeons & Dinobots, a text-based story from Fun Publications. He defends the Arch-Ayr fuel dump from an Autobot attack.

The toy for the heroic Starscream is a redeco of the Cybertron Voyager Starscream and was available only in the 2008 BotCon. His color scheme is an homage to the Generation 1 Autobot Jetfire.

Transtech 
Another incarnation of Starscream works in civil intelligence on Transtech Cybertron. This Starscream appeared in the Fun Publications story "Transcendent", where he reported his findings on Skyfall and Landquake to Optimus Prime. Prowl and Starscream had a biographies printed by Fun Publications.

Dreamwave Productions 
In the 21st century re-imagining of the Generation One universe by the comics company Dreamwave Productions, Starscream remained his treacherous, power-hungry self. In the early days of the war on Cybertron, he devastated Iacon with a terraforming process, and went on to form his own faction called the Predacons when Megatron vanished in a space-bridge experiment. 

Dreamwave Productions produced a companion comic for the G1 toyline just as Marvel Comics produced, it was different from the animated continuity. In these comics, the Armada incarnation of Starscream had a much smaller role but was written in a fashion much closer to the original treacherous G1 character - a trait that would ultimately lead to his seeming demise when the Energon comic book began. He still possessed elements of the animated Armada Starscream, such as an unwillingness to shy away from the battle.

Starscream would appear in many of Megatron's subsequent schemes, including capturing Swindle, attempting to capture Mini-Cons for his own use, and launching an attack on the Mini-Con base on the Moon. His next appearance would be 10 years after Unicron's defeat. When Starscream gatecrashed a meeting of the Terrorcons – renegade Decepticons who were unhappy with the peace between Autobot and Decepticon that had emerged in the wake of Unicron's defeat – at an energon plant, his mistake soon became apparent when he discovered that they had struck a deal with Unicron and gained new "Hyper Mode" powers. When their leader, Scorponok, arrived, Starscream was unable to talk himself out of trouble and was blasted into the plant's machinery by Scorponok, seemingly dying. But Starscream survived. The raw energon in the plant reacted in some mysterious way, giving him a ghostly body of pure energon (like the cartoon Energon version, this was also a homage to the ghost form of the original Starscream). In this form, he ended up attacking Demolishor and draining him of his energy. Due to the collapse of Dreamwave, the series was stopped.

Devil's Due Publishing 
In this crossover from Devil's Due Publishing, the Ark was discovered by the terrorist Cobra Organization, and all the Transformers inside were reformatted into Cobra vehicles remotely controlled by the Televipers.

IDW Publishing 

After Dreamwave's closure, the rights to the Transformers comics were taken up by IDW Publishing. Their version of the Generation One universe begins with a miniseries called The Transformers: Infiltration. His alternate mode here is that of an F-22 Raptor, foreshadowing the events of the 2007 live-action movie. 

Beast Wars Second Starscream had a biography printed in the Beast Wars Sourcebook by IDW Publishing. IDW also published a one-shot Transformers story as part of their Deviations series that heavily featured Starscream: "'Til All Are One."

In this story, an alternate version of events from The Transformers: The Movie, Starscream took over leadership of the Decepticons after Megatron was killed by Optimus Prime. Thus, it was Starscream who first encountered Unicron and allied the Decepticons to him, after being upgraded by Unicron's power into the mighty Megascream. He briefly hunted the Autobots in an effort to destroy the Matrix of Leadership, but later turned against his benefactor when Unicron devoured one of Cybertron's moons, which Starscream saw as his own. When Unicron attacked Cybertron itself and Optimus Prime arrived to try and stop him, Megascream demanded that he hand over the Matrix, and combined with Astrotrain, Soundwave, Ramjet, and Dirge into a massive new form. However, Hot Rod soon arrived to rescue Optimus, and unleashed the power of the Matrix, resulting in Unicron's demise as well as that of Megascream and himself.

Combiner Wars 
In conjunction with the Combiner Wars (Unite Warriors in Japan) line, Takara Tomy released a comic detailing how the Galvatronus combiner came to be. Following his defeat at the conclusion of The Headmasters, Galvatron's icy tomb was discovered by Cyclonus, whose body Galvatron modified to accommodate his own head in the chest compartment. Seeking a more fitting form, Galvatron directed Cyclonus to approach the disembodied head of Unicron, who was convinced to help Galvatron attain a combiner form with Cyclonus as its core. To accomplish this, Unicron used his power to open dimensional rifts in order to bring Curse Armada Thrust, Zombie War Breakdown, and Wandering Roller into their world. To Cyclonus' surprise, Starscream then made an appearance, expressing interest in joining this new alliance. Unicron promptly granted Starscream a new physical form, though half-alive-half-dead to ensure loyalty, and Galvatron's head took control of his new minions to take on his new form of Galvatronus.

Video games 
Starscream appears as a playable character in Hasbro's Net Jet fighting game Transformers Battle Universe. Although other playable Transformers have several incarnations featured, the only playable incarnation of Starscream is the Generation 1 version.  He is also featured a boss in the 2004 Transformers video game for the PlayStation 2.

Starscream appears in Activision's Transformers: The Game, based on the 2007 live-action film. He is voiced by Daniel Ross. In the Autobot campaign, Starscream appears as a boss in the second mission of the fourth chapter, where he is defeated by Jazz. In the Decepticon campaign, Starscream acts as Decepticon leader until Megatron's resurrection and is playable in the third chapter. A color scheme for Starscream inspired by the Generation 1 version of the character can be unlocked by completing the Decepticon campaign. In the Nintendo DS version of the game, Transformers: Autobots, Starscream serves as a boss at the end of the Arctic levels, trying and failing to kill Ironhide. In Transformers: Decepticons, Starscream initially serves as leader of the Decepticon forces on Earth and Create-A-Bot's mentor but secretly plots to seize the AllSpark for himself. After killing Bumblebee, Starscream takes the AllSpark, kills Megatron loyalist Blackout and Barricade, and battles Megatron and his disillusioned apprentice. He is eventually defeated by Create-A-Bot and then executed by Megatron for his treason. The G1 Starscream color scheme also appears as an unlockable bonus form for Create-A-Bot. 

In the sequel Transformers: Revenge of the Fallen, itself based on the film's sequel, Starscream acts as leader of the Decepticons following Megatron's death, though he returns to his old position as second-in-command once Megatron is resurrected. He is playable in several levels of the Decepticon campaign, and appears as a boss, alongside Megatron, in one of the final levels of the Autobot campaign. In Transformers: Dark of the Moon, which acts as a prequel to the film of the same name, Starscream (voiced by Steven Blum) is playable in the fifth level, where he intercepts and destroys a weapons transport mid-flight, battling the Aerialbots in the process. He also appears in the Nintendo 3DS and Wii versions of the game, though he is reduced to a minor supporting role.

Starscream appears in Transformers: Prime - The Game. He serves as a boss in the third and eleventh levels of the single-player campaign, fighting Bulkhead on both occasions, and is playable in the multiplayer mode.

Cybertron series 
Starscream appears in the 2010 video game Transformers: War for Cybertron, voiced by Sam Riegel. He appears as an enemy in the level "Dark Energon", as a playable character in the level "Starscream's Brigade", and as a boss in the level "Defend Iacon". He is also playable in the game's escalation mode, and his body type is available to use for the player's multiplayer custom Decepticon scientist. Starscream also appears as a level boss in the Nintendo DS version of the game, Transformers: War for Cybertron - Decepticons.

Starscream is initially depicted as an Autobot Sky Commander who, following a demotion by the Autobot leader Zeta Prime, was appointed guardian of an ancient space station dedicated to creating Dark Energon. When Megatron and his Decepticons attack the station, hoping to use Dark Energon to gain an advantage over the Autobots, Starscream tries to stop them but fails. Megatron then tempts Starscream with power and, after proving capable of wielding Dark Energon, convinces him to join the Decepticons. Starscream and his fellow Seekers, Thundercracker and Skywarp, are then ordered by Megatron to reactivate an old Energon Bridge to allow the manufacture of more Dark Energon. The trio succeeds, and Starscream is later shown leading the Decepticons' aerial squadrons during Megatron's invasion of Iacon City, the Autobots' capital. When Megatron orders the deployment of Dark Energon bombers, Starscream refuses, feeling they would be wasted, but Megatron overrides his refusal. Later, when Megatron is presumed dead while fighting Omega Supreme, Starscream wastes no time to declare himself Decepticon leader, only for Megatron to quickly confirm he is still alive and order Starscream to attack Omega Supreme as a distraction tactic. Shortly after, when the battle seems lost, Starscream is ready to sound a retreat, which Megatron overrides by threatening to execute any retreating Decepticon. In the Autobot Campaign, which directly follows the Decepticon Campaign, Starscream battles his former allies Jetfire and Silverbolt, and attacks Optimus Prime, Bumblebee, and Ratchet in the Decagon Plaza. However, he is forced to retreat after being injured by Optimus's axe.

Starscream returns in the 2012 sequel Transformers: Fall of Cybertron, where, after Megatron is killed by Metroplex, he assumes command of the Decepticons. However, Starscream proves to be a poor leader, using most of the Decepticons' energy supplies to further his own ego, resulting in many Decepticons becoming distrustful of him. After the Autobots harvest the Energon from a destroyed Space Bridge, Starscream plans to ambush the Autobot transport carrying it and steal it for himself, but rebuffs Onslaught' warnings about the transport's anti-aircraft cannons, resulting in most of the Decepticon aerial squadron being destroyed. Starscream orders a retreat, but the rebellious Combaticons disobey him and manage to capture the transport, albeit losing half of the Energon supply. Starscream promptly has them arrested for treachery, along with all those who defied his reign. Later, as Starscream decides to have a coronation to celebrate him becoming leader of the Decepticons (in an homage to the 1986 film), he is confronted by a revived Megatron. Megatron assumes leadership once again while Starscream is forced to flee, becoming a wanted fugitive. Starscream is playable in the level "Starscream's Betrayal", where he infiltrates Shockwave's lab to sabotage his experiments as part of his revenge plan against Megatron, and encounters a captured Grimlock. He offers the Autobot freedom in exchange for his fealty, but Grimlock instead grabs Starscream and throws him into a control panel, freeing himself and leaving Starscream unconscious.

Starscream also appears in the 2014 game Transformers: Rise of the Dark Spark, set between the events of War for Cybertron and Fall of Cybertron. He, Shockwave, and Soundwave are ordered by Megatron to search the abandoned Crystal City for a powerful artifact called the Dark Spark, which could secure the Decepticons' victory in the war. Although they manage to find it, and even secure the loyalty of a swarm of Insecticons along the way, the Dark Spark is grabbed by the Autobots first, who escape with it. Starscream follows them, trying to recover the Dark Spark, but is attacked by the Insecticons and is unable to prevent the Autobots from boarding a train. Fortunately for the Decepticons, Shockwave rigged the train with explosives, and he and Sharpshot are able to recover the Dark Spark from the Autobots.

Transformers Cinematic Universe 

During the production of the live-action film, writer Alex Kurtzman stated that Starscream would not stray from his treacherous roots as he seeks to overthrow Megatron, and frequently engages in arguments with him. In the first film, he is seen vehemently pledging his allegiance to Megatron when the latter breaks free from the Hoover Dam, but unlike the other Decepticons, he is not killed in the final battle and leaves Earth at the end of the movie. Starscream transforms into a Lockheed Martin F-22 Raptor. Starscream is armed with a rotary cannon, missile launchers, and a saw. When in jet mode, he can simulate the presence of a human pilot, the same holographic model (referred to as "Mustache Man" on-set and in the credits) that "pilots" Blackout and "drives" Barricade. The actor is Air Force Major Brian Reece, a helicopter pilot instructor at Kirtland Air Force Base.

Role in the films 

In the first film, Starscream rallies the other Decepticons to battle once Frenzy alerts them to the AllSpark's location. Starscream disguises as an F-22 Raptor providing cover for humans in Mission City and severely injures Bumblebee. After flying through the city, Starscream attempts to take the AllSpark from Sam, but is later attacked by both Ironhide and Ratchet. Ironhide takes the most damage, while Ratchet was able to hold his ground against Starscream's attacks. He transforms back into jet mode and flies away, leaving Ironhide and Ratchet damaged. He then assists Megatron in going after the AllSpark by shooting down the helicopter that was going to extract the Cube from Sam. Later, he attacks several F-22 Raptors flying through Mission City. Due to him transforming into a Raptor himself, Starscream was able to escape the jets as they were firing back at him. After Megatron was killed by Sam, Starscream retreats into deep space.

In the second film, Starscream is first seen aboard the Nemesis shipwreck and is confronted by a returning Megatron, angry that Starscream left him to die. Starscream explains that he and the Fallen engineered a new army of Decepticons, but reveals to Megatron that without sufficient energon levels to feed them, the hatchlings destined to become the new army will keep dying. Later in a factory near Sam's college, Starscream watches as Megatron plans to cut out Sam's brain and later Optimus Prime and Bumblebee arrive. Starscream joins Megatron and Grindor in a battle against Optimus Prime in the forest, which resulted in Optimus cutting off Starscream's right arm and ripping Grindor's head in half, however Megatron managed to kill Optimus by stabbing him in the back and shooting his spark out. Megatron and Starscream retreat as the Autobots arrive to save Sam. Megatron berates Starscream again after failing to capture the human. During the battle in Egypt, Starscream informs Megatron about the NEST soldiers and the Autobots planning to resurrect Optimus with the Matrix of Leadership. Starscream then leads the Decepticons on the hunt for Sam and Mikaela, sends Rampage after them, and leads the assault against the Autobots and NEST. After the Fallen was killed by super-mode Optimus Prime and Megatron was badly damaged, Starscream advises his leader to escape.

In the third film, Starscream first appears alongside Megatron, Soundwave, and Laserbeak in Africa. He gloats about Megatron's weakened state, which angers his master. In Washington DC, after Sentinel Prime betrayed the Autobots, Megatron and Starscream both witnessed Sentinel Prime bring an army of Decepticons to Earth from the Moon. He later shoots down the Autobot spaceship, the Xantium, after they have been exiled by the U.S. government. After the Autobots are thought to be dead, Megatron, Starscream, and Sentinel witness the city of Chicago is being invaded and attacked by a massive Decepticon army. During the battle in Chicago, he meets Sam again and mocked him. Sam uses a grappling glove that was given to him by Que/Wheeljack to take out Starscream's right eye. Starscream then panics and sends Sam flying through the air than through a window of a nearby building. NEST soldiers led by Lennox arrive and they attack Starscream. Sam finally kills him using a boomstick given by Que/Wheeljack and stabs him in the other eye, blinding him and eventually blowing his head up.

In Transformers: Age of Extinction, a photo of Starscream appears with a red X indicating his death.

In Transformers: The Last Knight, Starscream's rebuilt head is brought by Daytrader to Cade Yeager with Daytrader puppeting Starscream's mouth. Unamused, Cade knocks Starscream's head aside. It is later found by Megatron who briefly laments to it before abandoning the head in Cade's junkyard.

In Bumblebee, Starscream appears during the battle on Cybertron in a non-speaking cameo and is commanded by Soundwave to attack the Autobots. Due to the film being a reboot and ignoring the events of the previous films, Starscream was redesigned based on his G1 incarnation and does not share any traits with the previous live-action character.

Other media

Books 
In the prequel novel Transformers: Ghosts of Yesterday, it is revealed that Starscream is the leader of the Decepticons following Megatron's disappearance during his search for the Allspark. He and a crew of Decepticons travel aboard the Nemesis to search for the Allspark and Megatron, although Starscream is more focused on finding the cube then his lost master. Blackout opposes him at every turn (rightly not trusting Starscream and thinking that he would prefer that they never find Megatron), while Barricade tolerates it only as a means of finding Megatron. Encountering Ghost-1, a human craft of Cybertronian design, Starscream manipulates them into revealing that Megatron and the Allspark are on Earth, then betrays them. After winning a fierce duel with Blackout for leadership, he launches a full-scale assault on the Autobots. Just as he and Bonecrusher almost kill Optimus Prime, Starscream is severely injured by Ghost-1. In retaliation, he destroys the human craft before retreating.

Starscream returns in Transformers: The Veiled Threat. With Megatron dead, Starscream eventually returns to Earth around Zambia, where he gains control over local rebel groups by using his internal synthesizers to create gold coins.

IDW Publishing 
The back story of the Transformers on ancient Cybertron is told in Transformers: Defiance. In this story, Starscream returns to Cybertron after encountering an enemy scout ship in the Eshems Nebula. After being repaired for minor damage by Ratchet, Starscream and Ironhide report to Optimus Prime and Megatron. Later, the planet is invaded by aliens from the Eshems Nebula and Starscream is among the defenders in the city of Metrotitan, near the temple at Simfur. In issue #2, he sides with Megatron in his decision to counterattack Cybertron's invaders and is among the fleet that attacks their ships.

Starscream also appears at the end of issue #3 of Transformers: Movie Prequel, where he, Blackout and Barricade destroy the Mars Beagle probe. In issue 4, he travels to Earth, gaining his F-22 alternate mode by scanning an experimental Raptor before shooting it down.

He appears in the official movie sequel comic called "The Reign of Starscream".

In Transformers: Rising Storm, it is shown that Starscream has broken away from Megatron's rule, and formed his own army - Club Starscream - with Barricade and some others under his command. However, after blasting his way past Ruination and Deadlift, Shockwave tells Starscream that Megatron requires his services. Shockwave then sends Starscream to recover the drone called Brains.

Titan Magazine 
In "Twilight's Last Greaming" part 3, Starscream and Scorponok attack the Autobots Arcee, Armorhide, Elita One, Longarm, Skyblast and Strongarm on the moon. Starscream would return in issue #22 of the Titan Transformers Magazine series in a story called "The Decepticon who Haunted Himself".

Video games 
In the Nintendo DS Transformers: Decepticons game voiced by Daniel Ross, Starscream would kill Barricade and Blackout (and perhaps Brawl, who disappears after killing Ironhide), steal the Allspark, and betray Megatron. Starscream is fought by Megatron as the final boss after he is heavily damaged and loses the AllSpark to Create-A-Con. After being defeated, Megatron kills Starscream for being a traitor, as well as Create-A-Con for being weak. In Transformers Autobots, he is a simple boss who ambushes Ironhide and the Autobot Create-A-Bot in the Arctic but retreats after a long battle and does not reappear or heard of again. 

Starscream is among the playable characters in the 2009 Revenge of the Fallen video game by Activision. 

In the Nintendo DS game, Revenge of the Fallen: Decepticons, Starscream was the temporary leader of the Decepticons until The Fallen forces him to revive Megatron. 

Starscream appears in the 2011 Dark of the Moon video game. As a Hunter, he can be played on Xbox Campaigne and multiplayer

Starscream is among the characters who appear in the TRANSFORMERS CYBERVERSE Battle Builder Game.

Toys 

The original Starscream toy was originally part of the Japanese Diaclone toy line and was designed by Kohjin Ohno in the early eighties. It was imported to become part of the Transformers toy line by Hasbro in 1984. The toy was later re-issued in Japan in 2001, with black-and-gold and translucent "ghost" variants, and again in 2003, redecorated into a more cartoon-accurate color scheme. He was also reissued in the west in 2003, with extended missiles to comply with safety regulations. Japan re-released Starscream once again in 2007 for their "Encore Series". A highly prized collectable, the original Starscream toy has sold over $2000 on eBay. The original Starscream toy was altered somewhat and an electronic sound maker was added for the Generation 2 toy line.

Beast Wars Second Starscream had two toys produced exclusively in Japan. In 1997 he was released as a black redeco of Generation 2 Smokescreen. This same toy was recolored into Robot Masters Smokesniper. In 1998 he was released as "Hellscream", a remold of Beast Wars Cybershark. This second toy was eventually released with a slight color change in the US as Universe Overbite. Hellscream was voted the ninth strangest Transformers Beast Wars figure by Topless Robots.

The Armada toy was the first new-mould Starscream figure since 1990, and it clung to tradition with a jet alternate mode and a robot form featuring many callbacks to the original Starscream figure, such as shoulder-wings, air intakes on the shoulders, a cockpit in the chest, and a head-sculpt designed to look like the original animated character. When the Mini-Con port on his backpack is pulled back and held, an electronic jet-take off noise is made. Attaching his Mini-Con partner Swindle to this port, however, unlocks his shoulder-mounted null laser cannons, and changes the sound to a repeating laser blast. Swindle can also mount under the jet-mode nosecone – by pressing the cockpit, Swindle is dropped to the ground with an accompanying electronic noise, while a press without Swindle attached yields more noises. In robot mode, Starscream's left wing can detach and unfold into a sword for him to wield.

Starscream for the 2007 and 2009 movie had numerous toys released. He was one of two promotional figures released long before the 2007 movie as a "protoform". During the 2007 film release he was sold in various size classes as a licensed F-22 Raptor replica. These toys were recolored and released as fellow Decepticons Ramjet, Skywarp, and Thundercracker. During the 2009 film, he was released as both redecos of the 2007 film toys as well as new molds. All toys of this character are officially licensed from Lockheed Martin.

Animated Starscream also received numerous toys in many size classes during the run of the Animated toy line. Many of the Starscream toys were recolored as his clones Skywarp, Thundercracker, Ramjet, Dirge and Sunstorm. In 2008 a McDonald's Happy Meal was produced with a simple transforming Starscream toy inside to promote the series. This Starscream was also released in the Universe toy as a small Legends figure, shipping with a whole wave of tiny Animated characters. In Japan the Starscream figures were released in metallic finish by Takara.

Prime
 Prime First Edition Deluxe Starscream (2011): An all-new mold of Starscream from the Prime animated series.
 Prime Cyberverse Commander Starscream (2012): A smaller-scaled version of Starscream with translucent red arm cannons.
 Prime Robots in Disguise Revealers Deluxe Bumblebee vs. Deluxe Starscream Entertainment Pack (2012)
 Prime Voyager Starscream: A Voyager Class figure of Starscream with missiles and a null ray blaster.
 Generations Cybertronian Starscream (Deluxe, 2013)
 Prime: Beast Hunters Deluxe Class Starscream with Clenching Thunder Talon(2013)

References

External links 
 G1 Starscream at the Transformers Wiki

Villains in animated television series
Articles containing video clips
Extraterrestrial supervillains
Fictional aircraft
Fictional characters who committed sedition or treason
Fictional characters with immortality
Fictional commanders
Fictional ghosts
Fictional henchmen
Fictional kidnappers
Fictional mutants
Fictional sharks
Male characters in animated series
Male characters in comics
Male film villains
Science fiction film characters
Television characters introduced in 1984
Transformers characters
Video game bosses